Péter Erdő (born 25 June 1952) is a Hungarian Cardinal of the Latin Church of the Catholic Church, who has been the Archbishop of Esztergom-Budapest and Primate of Hungary since 2003.

He was president of the Council of the Bishops' Conferences of Europe from 2006 to 2016 and was the relator general for the Third Extraordinary General Assembly of the Synod of Bishops in Rome.

Erdő is reputed to have a special Marian devotion to Our Lady of Consolation. He is fluent in English, Italian, French, Latin and Hungarian, his native language. He also addressed the faithful in fluent Slovak language in the past.

Biography

Erdő was born in Budapest on 25 June 1952, the first of the six children of Sándor and Mária (née Kiss) Erdő. He studied at the seminaries of Esztergom and Budapest, and the Pontifical Lateran University in Rome (where he attained a doctorate in both theology and canon law). On 18 June 1975, Erdő was ordained to the priesthood by Archbishop László Lékai, and was incardinated in the Archdiocese of Esztergom. He worked as parochial vicar in Dorog, and then continued his studies in Rome from 1977 to 1980. For the next eight years, he taught as a professor of theology and canon law at the Seminary of Esztergom, and held guest lectures at several foreign universities. Erdő served in the Hungarian Episcopal Conference as Secretary of the Commission of Canon Law in 1986, and later as its president in 1999. In 1988 he began teaching theology at the Pázmány Péter Catholic University, serving as rector from 1998 to 2003. From 2005 he is the Great Chancellor of the university.

On 5 November 1999, he was appointed an auxiliary bishop of Székesfehérvár and titular bishop of Puppi. He received his episcopal consecration on 6 January 2000 from Pope John Paul II with Archbishops Giovanni Battista Re and Marcello Zago, OMI, acting as co-consecrators. Erdő was named Archbishop of Esztergom-Budapest on 7 December 2002 which carries the title of Primate of Hungary. Erdő became a corresponding member of the Hungarian Academy of Sciences in 2007 and a full member in 2013. In 2011, he was given an honorary doctorate by the University of Navarra (Spain).

Cardinal
He was created Cardinal-Priest of Santa Balbina by John Paul II in the consistory of 21 October 2003. He was the youngest member of the Sacred College until the appointment of Reinhard Marx in 2010.

Erdő was one of the cardinal electors who participated in the 2013 papal conclave that elected Pope Francis.

Erdő was elected to a five-year term as president of the Hungarian Episcopal Conference in September 2005 and to a five-year term as president of the Council of Episcopal Conferences of Europe in October 2006. On 17 January 2009 he was appointed a member of the Pontifical Council for Culture by Pope Benedict, and on 29 January 2011 of the Secretariat of State (Second Section).

Erdő sponsored the Thirteenth International Congress of Medieval Canon Law in Esztergom, 3–9 August 2008. On 19 October 2011, the apostolic nunciature in Peru announced that he was going to be apostolic visitor to intervene in the dispute between the Pontifical Catholic University of Peru and the Archdiocese of Lima. This was a controversial choice since the Archbishop of Lima Juan Luis Cipriani Thorne is a member of the same Opus Dei personal prelature that, through the Opus Dei's University of Navarra, granted Erdő a doctor honoris causa degree in that same year.

On 18 September 2012, Erdő was appointed by Pope Benedict XVI to be one of the Synod Fathers for the upcoming October 2012 Ordinary General Assembly of the Synod of Bishops on the New Evangelization.

Erdő had been mentioned as a possible candidate to be elected pope during the papal conclave 2013.

On 14 October 2013, Erdő was named by Pope Francis to serve as the Relator General of the Third Extraordinary General Assembly of the Synod of Bishops, which took place from 5 to 19 October 2014. The chosen theme is "The challenges of the family in the context of evangelization". He resumed his appointment as Relator General when the Synod reconvened in October 2015. In the 2015 book The Rigging of a Synod?, Vatican correspondent Edward Pentin claimed that Cardinal Lorenzo Baldisseri had pressured Erdő to soften the wording of his 2014 address to the Synod. In 2015, Erdő's second address to the synod was described by journalists, such as Damian Thompson of The Spectator and John L. Allen Jr. of the Boston Globe, as more theologically conservative in its tone.

Erdő has been mentioned as a possible candidate to be elected as the next Pope as of 2022.

Views

Cardinal Mindszenty
Erdő requested that the Hungarian Chief Prosecutor's Office legally, morally, and politically rehabilitate Cardinal József Mindszenty, his predecessor, who fought Hungary's Communist regime and was arrested by the country's Stalinist dictatorship, after which he sought refuge in the American embassy in Budapest. The Chief Prosecutor's Office ultimately rehabilitated Mindszenty in 2012 thanks to Erdő's intervention. In 2006, he sent a letter of gratitude to U.S. President George W. Bush on the 50th anniversary of Cardinal Mindszenty's forced arrest because of the political support that Americans had given to Mindszenty at the time.

Divorced and remarried Catholics
During a Vatican press conference in October 2014, Erdő expressed opposition to the idea of allowing divorced and remarried Catholics to receive Holy Communion.

Migrants
During the 2015 European migrant crisis, Erdő said that taking in refugees would amount to human trafficking.

Romani people
Erdő has written about the special socio-economic conditions of the Romani people and has openly wondered on the correct way to evangelize them.

Church in Hungary
Erdő has focused on Hungary's need to restore its faith and hope, while celebrating Midnight Mass at St. Stephen's Basilica in Budapest, to mark the Christmas holiday.

References

External links
 
 Cardinal Erdő bio

 
 

1952 births
Living people
21st-century Hungarian cardinals
Archbishops of Esztergom
21st-century Roman Catholic archbishops in Hungary
Members of the Apostolic Signatura
Cardinals created by Pope John Paul II
Members of the Hungarian Academy of Sciences
Pontifical Lateran University alumni
Members of the Pontifical Council for Culture
Members of the European Academy of Sciences and Arts
Clergy from Budapest